Behind Blue Skies is a 2010 Swedish drama film directed by Hannes Holm.

Cast 
 Bill Skarsgård - Martin
 Peter Dalle - Gösta
 Josefin Ljungman - Jenny
 Amanda Ooms - Siv
 Björn Kjellman - Nils
 Adam Pålsson - Micke
 Rasmus Troedsson - Ulf
  - Ann-Britt
 Peter Engman - Kenta
  - Nalle
 Erik Johansson - Jonte
 Stig Engström - Fritz
 Elin Klinga - Marketta
 Leif Andrée - Stig

References

External links 

2010 drama films
2010 films
Swedish drama films
2010s Swedish-language films
Films directed by Hannes Holm
2010s Swedish films